Melchior Heger was Thomaskantor from 1553 to 1564.

References

Thomaskantors
16th-century German people